Sextuplets Take New York is an American reality television series which premiered on TLC on September 14, 2010. The show features the Carpio family, consisting of parents Victor and Digna and their seven children, including sextuplets, the first Latino set born in America. The series follows the family through their daily lives, focusing on the challenges of raising multiple children in a modest home in Queens, New York. The family originally appeared in a one-hour episode of Multitude of Multiples.

Family history
Victor and Digna Carpio are both immigrants to America. As a child, Digna was sent by her divorced parents to the Ecuadorian mountains to work. When she emigrated to New York she spoke no English. Victor Carpio works as a maintenance man for the city Parks Department, and the family lives on his income (about $1800 per month).

The Carpio sextuplets are billed as America's first Latino sextuplets, and are bilingual, speaking both Spanish and English. They were born 15 weeks premature, and several of them suffer medical issues as a consequence.

Family
Older Brother - 
 Jhancarlos

Sextuplets - 
 Jaden Ivan
 Joel Alberth
 Jezreel Eliceo
 Justin Leo
 Genesis Victoria
 Danelia Victoria

Production
When the first season began filming, the sextuplets were 22 months old.

References

External links
 TLC: Sextuplets Take New York
 

2010 American television series debuts
2010 American television series endings
2010s American reality television series
Discovery Channel
English-language television shows
Sextuplets
Television series about children
Television series about families
Television shows set in New York (state)
TLC (TV network) original programming